Piz Miez (2,956 m) is a mountain of the Swiss Lepontine Alps, located south of Tenigerbad in the canton of Graubünden. It lies north of Piz Medel, in the Val Sumvitg.

References

External links
 Piz Miez on Hikr

Mountains of the Alps
Mountains of Switzerland
Mountains of Graubünden
Lepontine Alps
Two-thousanders of Switzerland